Edward Finch may refer to:

Politicians
Edward Finch (diplomat) (c. 1697–1771), British diplomat and politician
Edward Finch (British Army officer) (1756–1843), British general and MP for Cambridge
Edward C. Finch (1862–1933), American politician
Edward R. Finch (1873–1965), American lawyer and politician

Other
Edward Finch (composer) (1664–1738), English composer
Edward Finch (divine) (fl. 1630–1641), English Royalist divine